Royal Air Force Methven or more simply RAF Methven is a former Royal Air Force Satellite Landing Ground located  south east of Methven, Perth and Kinross, Scotland and  west of Perth, Perth and Kinross.

Station history
 No. 652 Squadron RAF were based at airfield between 28 March 1943 and 2 July 1943 where the squadron was equipped with the Taylorcraft Auster III before the squadron moved to RAF Ayr.
 SLG for No. 44 Maintenance Unit RAF for aircraft storage from the main station of RAF Edzell. (1 July 1941 - 1945)

See also
 List of former Royal Air Force stations
 List of Royal Air Force Maintenance units
 List of Royal Air Force Satellite Landing Grounds

References

Citations

Bibliography

Royal Air Force stations in Scotland
Military airbases established in 1940
Royal Air Force stations of World War II in the United Kingdom
Royal Air Force satellite landing grounds